Vince Sheehan (1916–1973) was an Australian rugby league footballer who played in the 1930s. He played for Western Suburbs in the New South Wales Rugby League (NSWRL) competition.

Playing career
Sheehan made his first grade debut for Western Suburbs in 1934. That season the club went from wooden spooners in 1933 to winning the minor premiership and premiership in 1934.

Sheehan played on the wing in the 1934 grand final victory over Eastern Suburbs at the Sydney Sports Ground with Sheehan scoring a try. As of the 2019 season, no other team since Western Suburbs has come from last place to winning the premiership the following year.

Sheehan played two further seasons for Western Suburbs before retiring at the end of 1936.

Sheehan played representative football for NSW City in 1936 scoring five tries from two appearances.

References

1916 births
1973 deaths
City New South Wales rugby league team players
Australian rugby league players
Rugby league players from New South Wales
Rugby league wingers
Place of birth missing
Place of death missing
Western Suburbs Magpies players